This article features the 2005 UEFA European Under-19 Championship elite qualification. Seven group winners qualified for the main tournament in Northern Ireland.

Teams
The following teams qualified for this round:

12 group winners from the first qualifying round

 
 
 
 
 
 
 
 
 
 
 
 

12 group runners-up from the first qualifying round

 
 
 
 
 
 
 
 
 
 
 
 

1 best group third-place finisher from the first qualifying round

 

3 teams received a bye for the first qualifying round

Group 1

All matches were played in England.

Group 2

All matches were played in the Czech Republic.

Group 3

All matches were played in Spain.

Group 4

All matches were played in Hungary.

Group 5

All matches were played in Austria.

Group 6

All matches were played in Russia.

Group 7

All matches were played in Serbia and Montenegro.

See also
 2005 UEFA European Under-19 Championship
 2005 UEFA European Under-19 Championship qualification

External links
Results by RSSSF

Qual
UEFA European Under-19 Championship qualification